Arthur Ashe was the defending champion of the singles event at the ABN World Tennis Tournament, but did not participate in this edition. First-seeded Dick Stockton won the singles title after a victory in the final against second-seeded Ilie Năstase 2–6, 6–3, 6–3.

Seeds

Draw

Men's singles

References

External links
 ITF tournament edition details

1977 ABN World Tennis Tournament